Scapegoat Hill is a small village 5 miles (8 km) west of Huddersfield, West Yorkshire, England. It is near to the villages of Slaithwaite and Golcar. The village together with nearby Bolster Moor has a population of 1,246.

This Pennine village is 328 metres above sea level at its highest point (near the millennium stone). It is also nearby the Moorside Edge Radio transmitter. 
The first recorded mention is from 1638 in the records of Huddersfield Parish Church  on the death of a child of a William Aneley. At that date, the place was called 'Slipcoat' (or Slippery Coat) Hill. The first record of the name 'Scapegoat Hill' occurs in an Enclosure notice placed in the Leeds Mercury in 1820. Although the first Ordnance Survey map (of 1843) uses the old name, 'Scapegoat Hill' was in regular use after 1820.

The village grew up around the woollen trade, and, in spite of having no mill, continued to grow in size throughout the nineteenth century. In fact, handloom weavers are recorded here as late as 1935.
Throughout the nineteenth century and well into the twentieth, the village was a very strong centre of baptism  opening a church  as a daughter of the Pole Moor Church 1871 and moving to its present building in 1900.

See also
Listed buildings in Colne Valley (eastern area)

References

Geography of Kirklees
Huddersfield
Colne Valley